Farndish is a village and former civil parish, now in the parish of Podington, in the Bedford district, in northwest Bedfordshire, England, located about 500 metres (yards) east of the county border with Northamptonshire. The village is near the Northamptonshire villages of Irchester and Wollaston and the Bedfordshire village of Wymington. In 1881 the parish had a population of 72.

It is in the electoral ward of Harrold. Much property in the area is owned by – once famous locally for their pork pies and pastry.

History
The name Farndish means fern-clad pasture. Farndish was mentioned in the Domesday Survey as 'Fernadis'.

According to Samuel Lewis

The local author H. E. Bates often would come through the village on his nocturnal walks in the 1920s and 1930s. It was on one of the night walks that he got the inspiration for his first novel, The Two Sisters, when he saw a light burning in a cottage window.

In 1937 The Times reported the plans being made in Farndish to mark the celebrations for the Coronation of King George VI and Queen Elizabeth – "a fine example of how England's villages may make this a memorable day in the lives of their people". On Coronation Day each of the twelve houses in the village was to be decorated to represent a different part of the British Empire. In the morning there would be a service in the parish church, for which the parson would come from Podington. "Then", according to The Times, "the population of 45 will adjourn to the village hall to drink the health of the King in ale. Port wine will be supplied to those who are teetotallers, in accordance with a well-known English custom." In the afternoon there were to be sports and games, and in the evening the villagers would return to the village hall for a fancy-dress dance and whist drive.

On 1 April 1884 the parish was abolished and merged with Podington.

The church

The church of St Michaels & All Angels appears to have been built sometime between 1180 and 1210. The masonry used to build the church is mainly local rubble along with some rust-coloured ironstone; the window dressings are of local limestone.

The tower was added in the 15th century within the nave and houses three bells:
Treble – cast by Christopher Grave – 1663
Second – cast by James Keene – 1625
Tenor – cast by Newcombe – 1597

The font dates to circa 1200 and is crowned by a 17th-century wooden cover – this is itself covered in 19th-century inscriptions and patterns. The very low pitched roof still has its original 15th-century timberwork.

According to "Kelly's Directory – the church is "a small building of stone, in the Transitional, Early English and later styles, consisting of chancel, nave and a low western tower rising within the nave, and containing 3 bells : the south doorway is a rich example of the Transitional Norman style : a beautiful stained east window was presented by the late Mr. W. H. S. Adcock, of this village, one on the south side by the Rev. Greville Chester, late rector, and there are several other stained windows : in the chancel is a small brass to John Johnston, rector (ob. 1625), being then nearly 100 years old; and there are also inscriptions to the Clark, Adcock and Alderman families : the church plate includes an ancient chalice:there are 69 sittings. The register dates from the year 1587."

The parish records for the church and village are available on microfiche for the period 1550-1812 from the Bedfordshire Family History Society.
Since 1970, the Church has not been used for regular worship but remains consecrated; since 1974 it has been opened and cared for by The Churches Conservation Trust and the donations of visitors. Repairs to the Church have been carried out for the fund by the Bedford architect Victor Farrar.
There is a healthy population of bats living in the belfry of the church.

References

External links

Villages in Bedfordshire
Former civil parishes in Bedfordshire
Borough of Bedford